Lipocosma ausonialis is a moth in the family Crambidae. It was described by Herbert Druce in 1899. It is found from Guatemala to central Costa Rica.

References

Glaphyriinae
Moths described in 1899